Ernesto Laguardia (born October 5, 1959) is a Mexican actor known for his performances in Mexican telenovelas.

Biography
Laguardia was born in Mexico City and started as a model while he was in elementary school. His enthusiasm eventually led him to important temporary contracts with Mexican and international companies. He also participated as a dancer in the television show Sabado del Rock.

Before getting his degree in Business Administration, he searched for job opportunities on radio stations. He started as messenger and in a few months he became a news reporter. During the two following years, he interviewed many famous people, including Julio Iglesias, Miguel Bosé, Armando Manzanero, and Rocío Dúrcal. Ernesto graduated from Business Administration ITAM (Instituto Tecnológico Autónomo de México), he also studied Economy but only graduated with a degree in business. Although he has a university title his passion was always acting.

Although Laguardia made his acting debut in Dune (1984) directed by David Lynch, it was three years before he got his first starring role in a telenovela; since then he has appeared in 17 telenovelas so far, including Quinceañera starring Adela Noriega and Thalía; Mi Querida Isabel; Alondra; Lazos de Amor; Desencuentro; Laberinto de Pasiones; La Antorcha Encendida; Amigas y Rivales; Amor Real and Amigos X Siempre.

He has also appeared in movies such as La Ley de las Calles, Ladrones de tumbas, Aquí Espantan, Maria Metralla, Cambio del Destino, Novia que te vea, The Wrong Man, and De noche vienes, Esmeralda.
 
He also studied Direction and Production at the University of New York, where he received a Masters on these subjects. Since 1996 he has been developing projects through his companies Foro 3 S.C and Producciones Ernesto Laguardia. While he lived in New York City he studied acting in Carnegie Hall with the famous Wynn Handman.

He joined Hoy program as Star magazine and was in the soap Amor Real, produced by Carla Estrada, he played Cristobal in Estrada's Alborada. In 2008 Ernesto returned to Hoy and had a small role in the telenovela Fuego en la sangre.

In 2012, Laguardia played Romulo Ancira, the main villain of the soap opera Corona de lágrimas (2012 telenovela).

Filmography

Films

Television

External links 

1959 births
Living people
Mexican male film actors
Mexican male telenovela actors
Male actors from Mexico City
Mexican people of Italian descent
Beauty pageant hosts